Alex Morgan is an  American soccer player who has competed as a forward for the United States women's national soccer team since 2010. Since her debut, appearing as a substitute in a match in the snow versus Mexico on March 31, 2010, she has played 190 matches. 

Morgan scored her first international goal against China in October 2010. With 115 goals, she is the fifth highest scorer in the national team's history. She is also eighth in all-time top scorers in women's international soccer.

International goals

Statistics

Goals by year

Goals by competition

See also
 List of women's footballers with 100 or more international goals
 List of women's footballers with 100 or more caps

References

External links
 Profile at United States Soccer Federation

Morgan goals
Morgan
Morgan goals
Morgan goals